Martin Hansen (17 July 1925 – 18 June 1999) was a Danish boxer. He competed in the men's middleweight event at the 1948 Summer Olympics.

References

1925 births
1999 deaths
Danish male boxers
Olympic boxers of Denmark
Boxers at the 1948 Summer Olympics
Boxers from Liverpool
Middleweight boxers